The George Earle Chamberlain House is a historic house in Albany, Oregon, United States.

Governor George Earle Chamberlain's house was entered on the National Register of Historic Places in 1980.

See also
National Register of Historic Places listings in Linn County, Oregon
George Earle Chamberlain House (Portland, Oregon)

References

External links

Oregon Historic Sites Database entry

Houses on the National Register of Historic Places in Oregon
National Register of Historic Places in Linn County, Oregon
Houses completed in 1880
1880 establishments in Oregon
Queen Anne architecture in Oregon
Governor of Oregon